HMS Wager was a square-rigged sixth-rate Royal Navy ship of 28 guns. She was built as an East Indiaman in about 1734 and made two voyages to India for the East India Company before the Royal Navy purchased her in 1739. She formed part of a squadron under Commodore George Anson and was wrecked on the south coast of Chile on 14 May 1741. The wreck of Wager became famous for the subsequent adventures of the survivors who found themselves marooned on a desolate island in the middle of a Patagonian winter, and in particular because of the Wager Mutiny that followed.

Service in the East India Company
Wager was an East Indiaman, an armed trading vessel built mainly to accommodate large cargoes of goods from the Far East. As an Indiaman she carried 30 guns and had a crew of 98.

Under Captain Charles Raymond she sailed from the Downs on 13 February 1735, arriving in Madras on 18 July and returning to England via St Helena in July 1736. She made her second and final run for the Company to India in 1738, sailing via the Cape of Good Hope to Madras and Bengal, and returning to the Downs on 27 August 1739.

Purchase by the Royal Navy
The Admiralty purchased Wager from Mr J. Raymond on 21 November 1739, and rated her as a 28-gun sixth rate. The Admiralty bought her to fill in a squadron under Commodore George Anson that would attack Spanish interests on the Pacific west coast of South America. Her role was to carry additional stores of small arms, ball and powder to arm shore raiding parties. It was apt that she carried the name of the principal sponsor of the voyage, Admiral Sir Charles Wager, First Lord of the Admiralty.

She was fitted for naval service at Deptford Dockyard between 23 November 1739 and 23 May 1740 at a cost of £7,096.2.4d, and was registered as a sixth rate on 22 April 1740, being established with 120 men and 28 guns.

Anson's circumnavigation

Anson's expedition to the Pacific in August 1740 comprised six warships and two transports, manned by a total of 1,854 men. The Navy commissioned Wager under Captain Dandy Kidd, who died before the ship reached Cape Horn; Lieutenant David Cheap was promoted to captain (acting). The squadron rounded Cape Horn in terrible weather, which scattered the ships of the squadron. Wager became separated and then needed to make her rendezvous. Unfortunately, she turned north before she had sailed sufficiently far to the west, and in foul weather closed the coast of modern-day Chile.

Wreck of Wager

On 13 May 1741 at 9:00am, the carpenter went forward to inspect the chain plates. Whilst there he thought he caught a fleeting glimpse of land to the west. Lieutenant Baynes was also there but he saw nothing, and the sighting was not reported. Consequently, no one realised that Wager had entered a large, uncharted bay.

At 2:00pm land was positively sighted to the west and northwest and all hands were mustered to make sail and turn the ship to the southwest. During the operations that followed, Captain Cheap fell down the quarterdeck ladder, dislocated his shoulder, and was confined below. The ship's disabled and worn-out condition severely hampered efforts to get clear of the bay.

At 4:30am the next day the ship struck rocks repeatedly, broke her tiller, and although still afloat, was partially flooded. Invalids below who were too sick to get out of their hammocks drowned. The ship was steered with sail alone towards land, but later in the morning the ship struck again, and this time became hard aground.

Wager had struck the coast of what would subsequently be known as Wager Island (:es:Isla Wager) in position  in Guayaneco Archipelago. A nearby island just to the west is named Byron Island (:es:Isla Byron), in honour of John Byron.

Some of the crew broke into the spirit room and got drunk, armed themselves and began looting, dressing up in officers' clothes and fighting. The other 140 men and officers took to the boats and made it safely on shore. On the following day, Friday 15 May, the ship bilged amidships and many of the drunken crew still on board drowned.

The Wager mutiny

In the Royal Navy of 1741, officers' commissions were valid only for the ship to which they had been appointed; thus the loss of the ship implied the loss of any official authority. Seamen ceased to be paid on the loss of their ship. After the wreck of Wager, these factors, combined with terrible conditions and murderous in-fighting between officers and men, caused discipline to break down. The party divided into two: 81 men under the gunner, John Bulkley, took to small boats with the aim of returning to England via the East coast of South America, and 20 men, including Captain Cheap and Midshipman John (later Vice Admiral ‘Foulweather Jack’) Byron remained on Wager Island. After a series of disasters, over five years later, six of Bulkley's group and four of Captain Cheap's group returned to England. Wager had left England with the best part of 300 men on board.

Spanish response and fate of the wreck site

The British arrival caused great alarm among the Spanish who searched extensively the Patagonian archipelagoes to cleanse it from any possible British presence. In the 1740s the viceroy of Peru and the governor of Chile converged in a project to advance the frontiers of the Spanish Empire in the Southeast Pacific and prevent the establishment of a British base. As a result of this plan the Juan Fernández Islands were settled and the fort of Tenquehuen established in Chonos Archipelago near Taitao Peninsula. This last fort was manned for a year and a half before being abandoned. After the Tenquehuen fort was dismantled the Marquis of the Ensenada, being briefed on local affairs, recommended the establishment of a fort in the Guaitecas Archipelago, but this never happened. For Governor Antonio Narciso de Santa María, Chiloé Island was the most important part of the Patagonian Archipelago recommending to concentrate on the defense of Chiloé. It was following Narciso de Santa María's recommendations that the Spanish  founded the "city-fort" of Ancud in 1767–1768.

Spanish charts of the mid-eighteenth century show the approximate location of the wreck, indicating that it was well-known to the local elite at the time. In late 2006, a Scientific Exploration Society expedition searched for the wreck of the Wager and found, in shallow water, a piece of a wooden hull with some of the frames and external planking. Carbon-14 dating indicated a date contemporary with the Wager. In 2007, the Transpatagonia Expedition visited the wreck site and saw more remains.

HMS Wager in fiction
The novel The Unknown Shore (pub. 1959) by Patrick O'Brian is based on the accounts of the survivors. One of the crew on Wager was Midshipman John Byron, later Vice-Admiral in the Royal Navy and grandfather of the famous poet George Byron. O'Brian's novel closely follows John Byron's account.

Citations

References
 Anon.  (1751) An Affecting Narrative of the Unfortunate Voyage and Catastrophe of His Majesty's Ship Wager. (London: J. Norwood).
 Bulkeley, John, & John Cummins. A Voyage to the South-Seas in the Years 1740-1. London: Jacob Robinson, 1743. Second edition, with additions, London, 1757.
 Byron, John (1785) Narrative of the Hon. John Byron; Being an Account of the Shipwreck of The Wager; and the Subsequent Adventures of Her Crew, 1768. Second edition.
 Campbell, Alexander (1747) The sequel to Bulkeley and Cummins's voyage to the South-seas. (London: W. Owen). 
 Edwards, Phillip (2004) The Story of the Voyage: Sea-Narratives in Eighteenth-Century England. (Cambridge). pp. 53–78.
 W. J. Fletcher. The Wreck of the Wager, Cornhill Magazine, New Series, volume 16 (January–June 1904), 394–411.
 
 Kerr, Robert (1824) A General History and Collection of Voyages and Travels, Arranged in Systematic Order, XVII. Edinburgh and London. Includes Byron's account, pp. 313–414 (327–428 of the pdf), and Bulkeley's, pp. 415–529 (429–543 of the pdf).
 Morris, Isaac (1752) Narrative of the Dangers and Distresses which befel Isaac Morris and seven more of the crew. (London: S. Birt).

Further reading
 

Maritime incidents in 1741
Maritime incidents in Chile
Sixth rates of the Royal Navy
Shipwrecks in the Chilean Sea
1730s ships
Ships of the British East India Company
Age of Sail merchant ships
Merchant ships of the United Kingdom